Gishton is an unincorporated community in Muhlenberg County, in the U.S. state of Kentucky.

History
A post office called Gishton was established in 1885, and remained in operation until 1912. The community was named after a family of early settlers.

References

Unincorporated communities in Muhlenberg County, Kentucky
Unincorporated communities in Kentucky